Plasmodium attenuatum is a parasite of the genus Plasmodium subgenus Carinamoeba.

Like all Plasmodium species P. attenuatum has both vertebrate and insect hosts. The vertebrate hosts for this parasite are reptiles.

Taxonomy 

The parasite was first described by Telford in 1973.

Distribution 

This species is found in Venezuela.

Hosts 

This species infects the lizard Ameiva ameiva.

References 

atheruri